Huitaca may refer to:
 Huitaca (goddess), Muisca goddess of arts, dance, music, sexual liberation and the Moon
 Huitaca (harvestman), a genus of harvestmen in the family Ogoveidae